Arkansas's 1st congressional district is a U.S. congressional district in eastern Arkansas that elects a representative to the United States House of Representatives. It is currently represented by Republican Rick Crawford. With a Cook Partisan Voting Index rating of R+22, it is the most Republican district in Arkansas, a state with an all-Republican congressional delegation.

Geography

2003–2013 

Before the 2010 census, the 1st district represented portions of northeastern Arkansas, encompassing the counties of Arkansas, Baxter, Clay, Cleburne, Craighead, Crittenden, Cross, Fulton, Greene, Independence, Izard, Jackson, Lawrence, Lee, Lonoke, Mississippi, Monroe, Phillips, Poinsett, Prairie, Randolph, Saint Francis, Searcy, Sharp, Stone, and Woodruff.

2013–2023 
The district was redesigned to take in additional counties in the southeastern portion that were part of the 4th district which in turn took the entire eastern Arkansas border. It is now more than 76% white, and they support Republican presidential candidates. 

The district fully encompasses the counties of Arkansas, Baxter, Chicot, Clay, Cleburne, Craighead, Crittenden, Cross, Desha, Fulton, Greene, Independence, Izard,  Jackson, Lawrence, Lee, Lincoln, Lonoke, Mississippi, Monroe, Phillips, Poinsett, Prairie, Randolph, Saint Francis, Searcy, Sharp, Stone, and Woodruff. The district also encompasses parts of Jefferson county.

Character
The Mississippi Delta became dominated by industrial agriculture in the 20th century, with cotton, rice and soybeans by far the biggest exports from the region. The 1st District covers most of the Arkansas Delta area and stretches as far west as the Ozarks. The farming areas, despite their fertility, are generally poor by national standards. Jobs are limited and unemployment and undereducation are major issues. Rice farms receive substantial subsidies from the federal farming program. Three of the top five subsidy farms in the United States are in the 1st District, and they have received more than $100 million since 1996.

Some manufacturing has been sited in the region recently. Several auto parts factories were built in Marion, and Toyota has considered it as the site for its seventh North American plant.

Jonesboro is the largest city. It is home to a sizable food processing industry, with companies such as Nestle and Frito-Lay sited here. Jonesboro is also home to Arkansas State University (ASU)-Jonesboro. While Jonesboro is dominated by conservative white Republican voters, as are some of the hill counties, African Americans in the Mississippi River Delta are committed Democratic voters.

Until recently, this resulted is a fairly closely divided vote in national politics. However, the district has been swept up in the growing Republican trend in Arkansas. While Al Gore narrowly carried the district in 2000 with 50% of the vote, George W. Bush won the district in 2004. The district swung even more Republican in 2008, giving John McCain 58.69% of the vote while Barack Obama received 38.41% here. The Republican vote has steadily increased since then, culminating in Donald Trump tallying 65 percent of the vote in 2016, his best showing in the state.

Recent election results from statewide races

List of members representing the district 
The district was created in 1853 after the 1850 United States Census added a second seat to the state.

Recent election results

2002

2004

2006

2008

2010

2012

2014

2016

2018

The 2018 election was held on November 6, 2018.

2020

2022

See also
United States House of Representatives elections in Arkansas, 2010

Notes
Arkansas will hold their Primary Elections on May 24, 2022 – a process which the State of Arkansas calls a Preferential Primary Election. If no candidate in a contested Primary Election receives 50% of the vote or more of the vote, than a Runoff Primary Election will be held on June 21, 2022 – a process which the State of Arkansas calls a General Primary Election.

There are currently three declared candidates for Arkansas’ 1st Congressional District for the 2022 Election Cycle.

The incumbent office holder is denoted by an *. Any rumored candidates are denoted by an +.

Arkansas will hold their General Election on November 8, 2022. If no candidate in a contested General Election race receives 50% or more of the vote, than a General Runoff Election will be held on December 8, 2022.

References
Specific

General

 Congressional Biographical Directory of the United States 1774–present

01